Searchlight Television is an American television production company that is a subsidiary of Searchlight Pictures, part of The Walt Disney Company. Founded in April 2018, broadening the variety of projects produced under the namesake Searchlight Pictures film banner. It is headed by David Greenbaum and Matthew Greenfield.

Both original material and adaptations of Searchlight's existing film library will be produced for cable, streaming and broadcast television, in the form of documentaries, scripted series, limited series and more.  In April 2019, the Hulu streaming service ordered The Dropout, starring Amanda Seyfried from Searchlight Television and 20th Television. The studio is also developing an adaptation of the City of Ghosts novel with ABC Signature and an adaptation of N. K. Jemisin's Inheritance Trilogy with Westbrook Studios. In October 2021, Hulu ordered a sequel series to the Mel Brooks film History of the World, Part I from Searchlight Television and 20th Television.

Filmography

References

20th Television
20th Century Studios
2022 establishments in California
Disney production studios
Companies based in Los Angeles
Entertainment companies based in California
Entertainment companies established in 2022
Mass media companies established in 2022
Peabody Award winners
Television production companies of the United States
Disney Television Studios